Stachycephalum is a genus of plants in the family Asteraceae.

 Species
 Stachycephalum argentinum Griseb. - Ecuador (Morona-Santiago), Argentina (Tucumán, Jujuy, Salta, Catamarca)
 Stachycephalum mexicanum Sch.Bip. ex Benth. - 	Oaxaca

References

Millerieae
Asteraceae genera